Đồng Khánh (lit. "collective celebration"; 19 February 1864 – 28 January 1889), born Nguyễn Phúc Ưng Kỷ (阮福膺祺) or Nguyễn Phúc Ưng Đường (阮福膺禟), also known as Chánh Mông (正蒙), was the ninth emperor of the Nguyễn dynasty of Vietnam. He reigned four years between 1885 and 1889. His royal temple name was Cảnh Tông (景宗).

Biography
Đồng Khánh was born on 19 December 1864 at Imperial City of Huế. He got the childhood name Chánh Mông when he was brought up in Chánh Mông palace. Đồng Khánh was the eldest son of Prince Nguyễn Phúc Hồng Cai (son of emperor Thiệu Trị) and Concubine Bùi Thị Thanh.

As his uncle, Emperor Tự Đức, had no children, Đồng Khánh was adopted and given the title Kiên Giang quận công (Duke of Kiên Giang).

Rule
After the French armies captured the city of Huế and the Purple Forbidden City fell to the French, the court regents Nguyễn Văn Tường and Tôn Thất Thuyết took the young Emperor Hàm Nghi and escaped from the Purple Forbidden City of Huế, and took him to Tân Sở in the mountains as the figurehead of a revolutionary movement against the French. To take away the legitimacy of Hàm Nghi, general de Courcy and résident de Champeaux of France asked the empress dowager Nghi Thiên to enthrone prince Nguyễn Phúc Ưng Kỷ (Hàm Nghi's elder half brother). On 19 September 1885, Prince Nguyễn Phúc Ưng Kỷ had to go to the governor of Annam to attend his coronation; he became the ninth emperor of Đại Nam with the era name of Đồng Khánh.

The emperor showed himself as a Pro-French ruler and this was also mentioned in the diary of Trần Trọng Kim:

Death
On 28 January 1889,  Đồng Khánh died 
aged 24 after reigning for three years. He was granted the posthumous name Hoằng Liệt Thông Thiết Mẫn Huệ Thuần Hoàng Đế (弘烈聰哲敏惠純皇帝), with the temple name Cảnh Tông (景宗).

In 1916, his son (Emperor Khải Định) granted him the name Phối Thiên Minh Vận Hiếu Đức Nhân Vũ Vĩ Công Hoằng Liệt Thông Thiết Mẫn Huệ Thuần Hoàng Đế (配天明運孝德仁武偉功弘烈聰哲敏惠純皇帝). He was buried in Tư Lăng mausoleum (思陵), which is located at Dương Xuân Thượng village, Hương Thuỷm commune, Thừa Thiên Province.

References

External links

 
 

Nguyen dynasty emperors
19th-century Vietnamese monarchs
1864 births
1889 deaths
Vietnamese monarchs